Thingyan rice (Thingyan htamin) is a traditional Mon dish served during Thingyan, the traditional Burmese New Year. Thingyan rice is infused with water and commonly served with a salad of cured salted fish, which is blanched and fried with onions, along with sour mango or marian plum. The dish is then garnished with roasted chili peppers. Although Thingyan rice originates from the Mon people, it is now commonly prepared throughout Lower Burma.

This festive dish has also been adapted into Central Thai cuisine, where it is known as khao chae.

References

See also
Thingyan
Khao chae

Burmese cuisine
Mon people
Mon State
Rice dishes